Kasper Simontaival (born 11 January 2002) is a Finnish professional ice hockey player who is currently playing for KalPa in the Liiga. He was drafted 66th overall by the Los Angeles Kings in the 2020 NHL Entry Draft.

Career statistics

International

References 

2002 births
Living people
Finnish ice hockey forwards
Los Angeles Kings draft picks
Tappara players
Ice hockey people from Tampere
21st-century Finnish people